Lang's Farm is a 7.5 hectare (18.5 acre) biological Site of Special Scientific Interest between Oake and Bradford on Tone in Somerset, notified in 1990.

This site is an example of unimproved, herb-rich neutral grassland of a type now rare in Britain.

References 

Sites of Special Scientific Interest in Somerset
Sites of Special Scientific Interest notified in 1990